Scooby-Doo 2: Monsters Unleashed (also referred to as  Scooby-Doo 2) is a 2004 American horror comedy film based on the animated franchise Scooby-Doo. It is the second installment in the Scooby-Doo live-action film series and the sequel to 2002's Scooby-Doo, and was directed by Raja Gosnell, written by James Gunn, and released by Warner Bros. Pictures. The film stars Freddie Prinze Jr., Sarah Michelle Gellar, Linda Cardellini, Matthew Lillard, Seth Green, Tim Blake Nelson, Peter Boyle and Alicia Silverstone, with Neil Fanning reprising his role as the voice of Scooby-Doo.

The film was released on March 26, 2004. Like the first film, it received generally negative reviews from critics and although financially successful it wound up grossing considerably less at the box office than its predecessor. The reception resulted in a third film, set to be written and directed by Gunn, being cancelled. A telefilm reboot featuring a new cast, Scooby-Doo! The Mystery Begins, aired on Cartoon Network in 2009.

Plot 
Fred, Daphne, Velma, Shaggy and Scooby-Doo attend the opening of an exhibition at the Coolsonian Criminology Museum commemorating their past solved cases with monster costumes on display. However, the celebrations are interrupted by a masked man known as the Evil Masked Figure who steals two costumes using the reanimated Pterodactyl Ghost. The gang are ridiculed by journalist Heather Jasper Howe, who starts a smear campaign against them. Shaggy and Scooby, after overhearing the rest of the gang criticizing their tendency to bumble every operation, and especially their most recent offense in failing to secure the Pterodactyl Ghost at the museum, resolve to better themselves and become real detectives. Concluding an old enemy is the mastermind, the gang revisit old cases. They dismiss the former Pterodactyl Ghost, Jonathan Jacobo, as the culprit due to his apparent death during a failed prison escape. They guess that Jeremiah Wickles, the Black Knight Ghost's portrayer and Jacobo's cell mate in prison, is the culprit.

Going to Wickles' manor, the group find a book that serves as an instruction manual on how to create monsters. Shaggy and Scooby-Doo find a note inviting Wickles to visit the Faux Ghost nightclub. They are attacked by the Black Knight Ghost, but escape when Daphne fights him off while Velma discovers its weak spot and disables it. Before fleeing, the rest of the gang discover through the book that the key ingredient to creating the monsters is "randomonium", a substance that can be found at the old silver mining town. Daphne, Velma and Fred go to the museum accompanied by the curator Patrick Wisely, but discover that the rest of the costumes have been stolen. Heather Jasper Howe turns the city against them. 

Following the lead from Wickles' note, their first clue ever, they sneak into the Faux Ghost, where the criminals whom the gang had unmasked hang out. Wearing disguises to try and solve the mystery, they speak to Wickles and hear how he has mended his evil ways. Scooby causes a scene and his disguise falls off, and the two escape through a trash chute. On their way out, they spot Patrick uncharacteristically assaulting someone who appears to be a member of his staff, ordering him to find answers to who vandalized his museum. Shaggy and Scooby then spot Wickles leaving the club and follow him. Fred, Velma, and Daphne go to the mines, finding Wickles' plans to turn it into an amusement park. They confront Wickles, who states that he and Jacobo were cell mates that hated each other and denies having any connection to the museum robberies.

The gang then find the Monster Hive where the costumes are brought to life as real monsters. Shaggy and Scooby play around with the machine's control panel, accidentally bringing several costumes to life, and the gang flees with the panel as the Evil Masked Figure terrorizes the city. Escaping to their old high school clubhouse, the gang realizes they can reverse the control panel's power by altering its wiring. Captain Cutler's Ghost emerges from the bayou, forcing the gang to head back to the mines, encountering the various monsters along the way. In the mines, Velma finds a shrine dedicated to Jacobo built by Patrick. However, Patrick proves his innocence by helping Velma after a catwalk unexpectedly gives way under her.

The gang confront the Evil Masked Figure as the Tar Monster captures all of them but Scooby, who uses a fire extinguisher to freeze the Tar Monster's body. He reactivates the control panel, turning the costumes back to normal. The gang takes the Evil Masked Figure to the authorities, unmasking him as Heather. Velma then peels Heather's face off, revealing she is actually Jacobo in disguise. He had survived the fall from the prison wall, sought to get revenge on the sleuths by discrediting them and turn the press against them, and also framed Wickles by putting the instruction manual and the Black Knight Ghost in his mansion. His cameraman Ned is also arrested as an accomplice.

The sleuths are praised as heroes in Coolsville. In the Faux Ghost, they celebrate their victory with the reformed criminals.

Cast

Live action 
 Freddie Prinze Jr. as Fred Jones
 Ryan Vrba as Young Fred
 Sarah Michelle Gellar as Daphne Blake
 Emily Tennant as Young Daphne
 Matthew Lillard as Shaggy Rogers
 Cascy Beddow as Young Shaggy
 Nazanin Afshin-Jam as Shaggy Chick
 Linda Cardellini as Velma Dinkley
 Lauren Kennedy as Young Velma
 Seth Green as Patrick Wisely
 Peter Boyle as Jeremiah Wickles
 Tim Blake Nelson as Dr. Jonathan Jacobo
 Alicia Silverstone as Heather Jasper Howe
 Karin Konoval as Aggie Wilkins
 Joe MacLeod as Skater Dude No. 1
 Brandon Jay McLaren as Skater Dude No. 2
 Rasmus Nøhr as Skater Dude No. 3
 Calum Worthy as Kid on Bike
 Stephen E. Miller as C.L. Magnus
 Zahf Paroo as Ned
 Christopher R. Sumpton as Zombie
 C. Ernst Harth as Miner 49er
 Kevin Durand as Black Knight Ghost

Voice cast 
 Neil Fanning as Scooby-Doo and Tasmanian Devil
 J. P. Manoux as Scooby Brainiac
 Scott McNeil as Evil Masked Figure
 Dee Bradley Baker as the voice of Pterodactyl Ghost, Zombie, and Red-Eyed Skeleton
 Bob Papenbrook as the voice of Black Knight Ghost
 Michael Sorich as the voice of Tar Monster and Cotton Candy Glob
 Terrence Stone/Dee Bradley Baker as the voice of 10,000 Volt Ghost
 Wally Wingert as the voice of Green-Eyed Skeleton

Cameos 
 Pat O'Brien
 Neil Fanning
 Tasmanian Devil
 Ruben Studdard
 Kester Moorhouse
 Big Brovaz

Production 
In June 2002, at the time of the release of Scooby-Doo, Dan Fellman, the president of Warner Bros., confirmed that a sequel was in the works, and was slated for a 2004 release. In March 2003, it was announced that Freddie Prinze Jr., Sarah Michelle Gellar, Neil Fanning, Matthew Lillard and Linda Cardellini would reprise their roles in the sequel. Filming for the sequel began on April 14, 2003 in Vancouver, with Seth Green and Alicia Silverstone joining the cast.

Reception

Box office 
Scooby-Doo 2: Monsters Unleashed opened March 26, 2004, and grossed $29.4 million (over 3,312 theaters, $8,888 average) during its opening weekend, ranking No. 1. It grossed a total of $84.2 million in North America, and went on to earn $181.5 million worldwide, more than $90 million less than the $275.7 million worldwide Scooby-Doo grossed two years earlier. It was the twenty-ninth highest-grossing film of 2004, and ranks as the sixth highest-grossing movie of all time featuring a dog (animated or otherwise) as a major character. 

The film was released in the United Kingdom on April 2, 2004, topping the country's box office for three straight weekends before being dethroned by Kill Bill: Volume 2.

Critical response 
On Rotten Tomatoes, Scooby-Doo 2: Monsters Unleashed holds a rating of 22% based on 119 reviews and an average rating of 4.3/10. The site's consensus reads: "Only the very young will get the most out of this silly trifle." On Metacritic, the film has a score of 34 out of 100 based on 28 critics, indicating "generally unfavorable reviews". Audiences polled by CinemaScore gave the film an average grade of "A−" on an A+ to F scale, an improvement over the previous film's "B+".

Roger Ebert of the Chicago Times gave the film two stars out of four, stating, "This is a silly machine to whirl goofy antics before the eyes of easily distracted audiences, and it is made with undeniable skill." Dave Kehr of The New York Times gave the film a negative review, saying, "In the strictly secular-humanist world of Scooby-Doo, there are no real ghosts, but only humans desperate for attention who disguise themselves as supernatural figures."

Peter Bradshaw of The Guardian gave the film a two out of five stars, stating, "it's straight down the line family fare, nothing inspired, nothing objectionable: a few funny lines." Nick DeSemlyn of Empire Magazine also gave the film two out of five stars, saying, "This sequel is a step up from the first. Scooby's animation is improved, there are some fun action sequences and a smattering of amusing moments. But the same manic mugging that spoiled the original mars this movie, and the result is a film only a six year-old on a sugar rush could love." Common Sense Media gave the film two out of five stars, saying, "Sequel is milder than original; potty humor, peril, violence."

The film won the Razzie Award for Worst Remake or Sequel.

Home media 
Warner Home Video released the film on DVD and VHS on September 14, 2004, in both full-screen and widescreen editions. The DVD included deleted scenes from the film's production and other special features, such as two music videos, a "making of" and trailers. On November 9, 2010, Warner Bros. released both the film and its predecessor as a double feature Blu-ray.

Video games 
Two video games loosely following the plot of the film were released in 2004 to coincide with the film's release; a 3D point and click adventure on the PC and a 2D beat 'em up platformer on the Game Boy Advance. In both games, one ending could only be seen by entering a code displayed at the end of the film after the credits.

Soundtrack 
A soundtrack was released on March 23, 2004, on compact disc and cassette tape.

 "Don't Wanna Think About You" by Simple Plan (Simple Plan had also performed the titular theme song)
 "You Get What You Give" by New Radicals
 "Boom Shack-A-Lak" by Apache Indian
 "Thank You (Falettinme Be Mice Elf Agin)" by Big Brovaz
 "The Rockafeller Skank" by Fatboy Slim
 "Wooly Bully" by Bad Manners
 "Shining Star" by Ruben Studdard
 "Flagpole Sitta" by Harvey Danger
 "Get Ready for This" by 2 Unlimited
 "Play That Funky Music" by Wild Cherry
 "Here We Go" by Bowling for Soup
 "Love Shack" by The B-52's
 "Friends Forever" by Puffy AmiYumi
 "Scooby-Doo, Where Are You?" by MxPx

Cancelled sequel film
In October 2002, during the filming of Scooby-Doo 2, Warner Bros. approved production of a third film. Dan Forman and Paul Foley were hired to write the script for Scooby-Doo 3. In August 2004, Matthew Lillard said in an interview that the third Scooby-Doo film was canceled because the second had not done as well as expected, which he attributed to Warner Bros. releasing it at an inappropriate time. In a 2019 interview, James Gunn revealed that he was set to write and direct but the film did not happen due to the financial disappointment of the previous film, stating, "although it did well, it didn't do well enough to warrant a third, so the movie was never made." Gunn tweeted the plot for the canceled film was that "The Mystery Inc. gang are hired by a town in Scotland who complain they are being plagued by monsters but we discover throughout the film the monsters are actually the victims. Scooby and Shaggy have to come to terms with their own prejudices and narrow belief systems."

References

External links 

 
 
 
 

2004 films
2000s adventure comedy films
2004 comedy horror films
2000s buddy comedy films
2000s fantasy comedy films
2000s ghost films
2000s monster movies
2000s comedy mystery films
American buddy comedy films
American adventure comedy films
American children's adventure films
American children's comedy films
American comedy horror films
American detective films
American fantasy adventure films
American fantasy comedy films
American films with live action and animation
American monster movies
American sequel films
Children's horror films
Films about dogs
American films about revenge
Looney Tunes films
Tasmanian Devil (Looney Tunes) films
Films directed by Raja Gosnell
Films produced by Charles Roven
Films produced by Richard Suckle
Films scored by David Newman
Films set in mining communities
Films set in museums
Films set in Ohio
Films shot in Vancouver
Films shot in Winnipeg
Films with screenplays by James Gunn
Hanna-Barbera animated films
Scooby-Doo live-action films
Scooby-Doo (film series)
Warner Bros. films
American children's animated comedy films
2004 comedy films
Films shot at Village Roadshow Studios
Golden Raspberry Award winning films
Cross-dressing in American films
2000s English-language films
2000s American films